Siyaram Silk Mills, Ltd, also known as Siyaram's and as SSM, is an Indian blended fabric and garment-manufacturer, with an associated chain of retail outlets and branded showrooms. Siyaram's was incorporated in 1978, and is headquartered in the Kamala Mills compound, Lower Parel, Mumbai.

Structure
Siyaram Silk Mills Ltd (SSM) is part of the Siyaram Poddar Group, which also comprises Balkrishna Industries Ltd and Govind Rubber Ltd, all listed companies at Bombay Stock Exchange. SSM is a small cap company with a market cap of ₹936.75 crores. Siyaram's manufactures and sells fabrics, ready-made men’s and women's apparel, home furnishing, and yarns. Siyaram's is associated with over 1 lakh retail outlets, and has over 170 branded showrooms spread across the nation. In the March 2014 quarter, the company's annualized net profit was ₹20.2 crores. Siyaram’s produces over 4 million metres of fabric produced per month; over 60 million meters of fabric annually.

Siyaram's brands include J Hampstead, Oxemberg among others.

Product line
According to the Economic Times, polyester viscose, derived from crude oil, forms nearly 85% of Siyaram's raw material. In 2014, Siyaram's saw 80% of revenues from fabric sales, 16% from garments, and 4% from yarn. Siyaram's weaving capacity is 8 crore metres; garment capacity is 40 lakh pieces per annum.

Like some other textile manufacturers, Siyaram's has entered the ready made-garment (RMG) sector.  Beginning in 2004, it has developed product lines in home furnishing, uniform, children's clothing, and a women's line.

On 24 September 2015, Siyaram's Silk Mills announced its global venture with a prominent Italian brand, Cadini at Sahara Star, Mumbai.
The company plans to develop an exclusive range of fabrics in long staple cotton, Giza cotton, linen, wool cashmere, wool-silk-linen, silk, wool blends, and jacketing fabrics in linen.

References

Clothing manufacturers
Clothing companies of India
Silk mills
Manufacturing companies established in 1978
1978 establishments in Maharashtra
Textile companies based in Maharashtra
Silk in India
Clothing brands of India